Masquelier may refer to:
 Adeline Masquelier (born 1960), Associate Professor of Anthropology at Tulane University in New Orleans, Louisiana
 Jacques Masquelier (or Jack Masquelier, 1922–2009), French chemist, discoverer of proanthocyanidins (OPC) in 1948
 Prosper Masquelier (born 1981), French poker player and businessman